Paul Eugene Blackwell Sr. (born August 19, 1941) is a retired United States Army lieutenant general. During his 31-year career in the United States Army, LTG Blackwell held a wide variety of command and staff positions including assignment as Deputy Chief of Staff for Operations and Plans (G3), Department of the Army and commanding general, 24th Infantry Division (Mechanized), at Fort Stewart, Georgia. Other key assignments include Deputy Director of Operations, National Military Command Center, Washington, DC; commanding general, 2d Armored Division (Forward), Garlstedt, Federal Republic of Germany, and Assistant Division Commander, 3d Armored Division, Federal Republic of Germany.

Blackwell earned a B.S. degree with honors in Agricultural Education from Clemson University in June 1963. He was commissioned as a reserve infantry officer through the Army ROTC program, but did not report for active duty until after he had completed an M.S. degree in Horticulture and Agricultural Education at Clemson in June 1965. Blackwell graduated from the Marine Corps Command and Staff College in June 1976 and the United States Army War College in June 1983.

Awards and decorations

References

1941 births
Living people
People from York, South Carolina
Clemson University alumni
United States Army personnel of the Vietnam War
Recipients of the Silver Star
Marine Corps University alumni
United States Army War College alumni
United States Army personnel of the Gulf War
Recipients of the Legion of Merit
United States Army generals
Recipients of the Distinguished Service Medal (US Army)